Alessandro Fortori (16th-century) was an Italian painter of the Mannerist period.

Biography
He was born in Arezzo. He was one of the fellow painters from Arezzo, along with Bastiano Flori and Fra Salvatore Foschi, recruited to paint at sundry projects by Giorgio Vasari. Fortori painted For the church of San Francesco (1568) in Citerna and for the church of San Domenico (1569) in Citta di Castello.

References

Year of birth unknown
Year of death unknown
16th-century Italian painters
Italian male painters
People from Arezzo
Mannerist painters
Painters from Tuscany